Jorge Coste (born 28 January 1959) is a Mexican water polo player. He competed in the men's tournament at the 1976 Summer Olympics.

References

1959 births
Living people
Mexican male water polo players
Olympic water polo players of Mexico
Water polo players at the 1976 Summer Olympics
Place of birth missing (living people)